"Detachable Penis" is a song by avant-garde band King Missile. It was the first single from the band's 1992 album Happy Hour, and became a modest hit, reaching number 25 on the Billboard Modern Rock Tracks chart.

Lyrical content
In "Detachable Penis," frontman John S. Hall recites a deadpan monologue in which he portrays the owner of the titular penis.

After a night of heavy drinking, the narrator awakens to find his penis is missing, which has happened on similar occasions. He looks for it in his apartment, calls the place where the party was to see if they had found it, and asks some people that were also at the party. Despite his best efforts, he is unable to recover his penis.

Depressed, he goes to Kiev Restaurant for breakfast. He then encounters a street vendor who is in possession of the missing penis. He negotiates the price and buys his penis back for $17. He cleans and reattaches it at home.

Musical content
The music of "Detachable Penis" consists largely of a  distorted electric guitar riff fed through a noise gate and a delay, backed by organ and drum grooves with brief lead guitar improvisation. For most of the track, the titular phrase is sung with an interval of approximately four seconds, or more accurately two 4/4 bars, the length of the guitar riff. The riff provides a harmonic ground of C# minor - G major - A major, which remains unchanged throughout the song.

Music video
The video for "Detachable Penis" was directed by Richard Kern at the suggestion of drummer Roger Murdock. Hall called Kern "the perfect choice." The video consists of a literal visual depiction of the song's narrative, interspersed with shots of the band performing and an anonymous woman simulating attaching and detaching the organ of the title (represented by a dildo complete with artificial scrotum and testicles).

Commercial performance and effect on band
In a 2003 interview, Hall stated that the commercial success of "Detachable Penis" led to a commercial backlash: "[A]fter that CD [Happy Hour], we didn't really get a lot of airplay". A few stations continued to be supportive, but I think that the success of 'Detachable' resulted in a lot of people getting pretty tired of what we were doing. That is one of the bad things about having a 'hit.'"

Moreover, said Hall, the band realized that the song had drawn in many casual fans who did not care about the rest of the group's material; thus, the band began to play the song "early in the set, so that the people who didn't like us could leave, and we could play for the people who cared. That worked out well. People did leave."

Interpretations
"Detachable Penis" has been subject to a wide array of interpretations. Some people take the lyrics at face value, while others see the story as an elaborate metaphor. In his review of Happy Hour, Michael C. Harris of Rolling Stone wrote of the song: "A parable of self-emasculation? Who knows? And Hall's not telling."

In a 1998 interview, Hall remarked,

Charts

See also
 Castration anxiety
 "The Nose" (Gogol short story)
 Strap-on dildo

References

1992 singles
1992 songs
Articles containing video clips
Comedy songs
King Missile songs
Manhattan in fiction
Music videos directed by Richard Kern
Novelty songs
Spoken word
Songs written by Chris Xefos
Songs written by Dave Rick
Songs written by John S. Hall
Atlantic Records singles